Sioux Central Community School District is a rural public school district headquartered in unincorporated Buena Vista County, Iowa, south of Sioux Rapids.

The district covers portions of Buena Vista and Clay counties, as well as small sections of Cherokee and O'Brien counties. It serves Sioux Rapids, Linn Grove, Peterson, Rembrandt, and Webb.

Since 2004, it has had an arrangement with the Albert City–Truesdale Community School District where that district sends its high school students to Sioux Central High School.

History
The four principal towns making up the Sioux Central district each had its own school system at one time. In the early 1960s, Linn Grove and Peterson merged their school districts to form the Sioux Valley CSD. In 1979, Rembrandt and Sioux Rapids merged their school districts to form the Sioux Rapids-Rembrandt CSD. Then in 1990, Sioux Valley and Sioux Rapids-Rembrandt began sharing to form the Sioux Central CSD.

The district was formed on July 1, 1993, by the merger of the Sioux Rapids-Rembrandt Community School District and the Sioux Valley Community School District. Sioux Rapids-Rembrandt served the communities of Sioux Rapids and Rembrandt while Sioux Valley served the communities of Linn Grove and Peterson.

The current school facility opened in 1995; it was a consolidation of four previous campuses.

On July 1, 2010, the South Clay Community School District was dissolved, and portions went to Sioux Central. Webb and the areas south of Gillett Grove were reassigned to Sioux Central.

Schools
The district operates three schools, all in the same building in Sioux Rapids:
Sioux Central Elementary School
Sioux Central Middle School
Sioux Central High School

Sioux Central High School

Athletics
The Rebels compete in the Twin Lakes Conference in the following sports:

Cross Country 
Volleyball 
Football 
Basketball
Wrestling (as Laurens-Marathon-Sioux Central)
Track and Field
Golf 
Baseball 
Softball

See also
List of school districts in Iowa
List of high schools in Iowa

References

External links
 Sioux Central Community School District

School districts in Iowa
Education in Buena Vista County, Iowa
Education in Cherokee County, Iowa
Education in Clay County, Iowa
Education in O'Brien County, Iowa
School districts established in 1993
1993 establishments in Iowa